The Prix Constantin is an annual French music prize awarded to the best album of an artist who has come to prominence during the course of the past year. It was inaugurated in 2002, following the example of the Mercury Music Prize, as an attempt to bring to light artists who have not had major media coverage ("the talents of today and tomorrow"). It is therefore open to individuals or groups who have not yet had a gold album, with the exception of the nominated album. Its basic purpose is to help  newer artists who are not very popular to gain publicity. All albums produced in France in the past year are admissible, without restriction on the nationality or language of expression of the artist. The winner is decided by a jury, headed by a musician, which contains representatives from the press, radio, television and record stores.

The Prix Constantin is named after the record industry figure Philippe Constantin, who died in 1996.

Winners and nominees

2011
Winner: Selah Sue – Selah Sue

Nominees:

 Alex Beaupain – Pourquoi battait mon cœur
 Brigitte – Et vous, tu m'aimes ?
 Cyril Mokaiesh – Du Rouge et des Passions
 Lisa Portelli – Le Régal
 Sly Johnson – 74
 Bertrand Belin – Hypernuit 
 Cascadeur – The Human Octopus
 L – Initiale
 The Shoes – Crack my Bones

2010
Winner: Hindi Zahra – Handmade

Nominees:

 Arnaud Fleurent-Didier – La reproduction
 Camelia Jordana – Camelia Jordana
 Féfé – Jeune à la retraite
 Gush – Everybody's god
 Stromae – Stromae
 Ben l'Oncle Soul – Ben l'Oncle Soul
 Carmen Maria Vega – Carmen Maria Vega
 Féloche – La vie Cajun
 Zaz – ZAZ

2009
Winner: Emily Loizeau – Pays Sauvage

Nominees:
Babx – Cristal Ballroom
Birdy Nam Nam – Manual for Successful Rioting
Diving with Andy – Sugar Sugar
Dominique A – La Musique
Fredo Viola – The Turn
Hugh Coltman – Stories from the Safe House
Orelsan – Perdu d'avance
Piers Faccini – Two Grains of Sand
Yodelice – Tree of Life

2008
Winner: Aṣa – Aṣa

Nominees:
Arman Méliès – Casino
Barbara Carlotti – L'Idéal
Cocoon – My Friends All Died in a Plane Crash
Joseph D'Anvers – Les jours sauvages
Julien Doré – Ersatz
Moriarty – Gee Whiz But This Is a Lonesome Town
The Dø – A Mouthful
Thomas Dutronc – Comme un manouche sans guitare
Yael Naïm and David Donatien – Yael Naim

2007
Winner: Daphné – Carmin

Nominees:
AaRON – Artificial Animals Riding On Neverland
Florent Marchet – Rio Baril
Justice – †
Kaolin – Mélanger les couleurs
Keny Arkana – Entre ciment et belle étoile
Keren Ann – Keren Ann
Ours – Mi
Renan Luce – Repenti
Rose – Rose

2006
Winner: Abd Al Malik – Gibraltar

Nominees:
Anis – La chance
Ayọ – Joyful
Clarika – Joker
Emily Loizeau – L'autre bout du monde
Grand Corps Malade – Midi 20
Jehro – Jehro
Katerine – Robots après tout
Olivia Ruiz – La femme chocolat
Phoenix – It's Never Been Like That

2005
Winner: Camille – Le fil

Nominees: 
Amadou & Mariam – Dimanche à Bamako
Anaïs – The Cheap Show
Bazbaz – Sur le bout de la langue
Bertrand Betsch – Pas de bras, pas de chocolat
Pauline Croze – Pauline Croze
Albin de la Simone – Je vais changer
Alexis HK – L’homme du moment
Franck Monnet – Au grand jour
Nosfell – Pomaïe klokochazia balek

2004
Winner: Cali – L'amour parfait

Nominees: 
Pierre Bondu – Quelqu'un quelque part
Jeanne Cherhal – Douze fois par an
Daniel Darc – Crève coeur
Feist – Let It Die
Florent Marchet – Gargilesse
JP Nataf – Plus de sucre
Ridan – Le rêve ou la vie
Tété – A la faveur de l'automne
Rokia Traoré – Bowmboï

2003
Winner: Mickey 3D – Tu vas pas mourir de rire

Nominees: 
A.S. Dragon – Spanked
Benjamin Biolay – Négatif
Carla Bruni – Quelqu'un m'a dit
Diam's – Brut de femme
Alexis HK – Belle Ville
Malia – Yellow Daffodils
Massilia Sound System – Occitanista
Raphael – La réalité
Emilie Simon – Emilie Simon

2002
Winner: Avril – That Horse Must be Starving

Nominees: 
Bumcello – Nude for love
Bénabar – Bénabar
Danyel Waro – Bwarouz
Dionysos – Western sous la neige
Gotan Project – La Revancha del Tango
Le Peuple de L'Herbe – P, H test/two
Renaud Papillon Paravel – La surface de réparation
Tiken Jah Fakoly – Françafrique
Vincent Delerm – Vincent Delerm

See also
 Mercury Prize (UK)
 Choice Music Prize (Ireland)
 Polaris Music Prize (Canada)
 Shortlist Music Prize (United States)
 Australian Music Prize (Australia)
 Nordic Music Prize (Nordic countries)

External links
 Official site (French)

French music awards
Awards established in 2002
2002 establishments in France